Miriam Rozella is a 1924 British silent drama film directed by Sidney Morgan and starring Moyna Macgill, Owen Nares and Gertrude McCoy.

Cast
 Moyna Macgill as Miriam Rozella  
 Owen Nares as Rudolph  
 Gertrude McCoy as Lura Wood  
 Henrietta Watson as Lady Laverack 
 Ben Webster as Lord Laverock  
 Nina Boucicault as Mrs. Rozella  
 Russell Thorndike as Crewe Stevens  
 Mary Brough as Housekeeper  
 Gordon Craig as Cecil Rozelle  
 Sydney Paxton as Priest

References

Bibliography
 Low, Rachael. The History of the British Film 1918-1929. George Allen & Unwin, 1971.

External links
 

1924 films
British drama films
British silent feature films
Films directed by Sidney Morgan
1924 drama films
Films based on British novels
British black-and-white films
1920s English-language films
1920s British films
Silent drama films